Baku Sports Palace (also known as Baku Sport Hall) is an indoor arena located in Baku, Azerbaijan. Originally the arena is named as Palace of Hand Games until 2015. It is located near the Baku Boulevard on the Caspian Sea coast. It was built in 1974 and was renovated in 2015. The palace consists of 1736 seats.

Various domestic and international competitions such as badminton, judo, futsal, wrestling, table tennis, taekwondo and volleyball are held in the Palace.

Events hosted

See also 
 Baku Olympic Stadium
 National Gymnastics Arena

References 

Sports venues in Baku
Sports venues completed in 1974
1974 establishments in the Soviet Union
2015 European Games venues